Raymond R. "Ray" Soden (March 26, 1925 – June 22, 2012) was an American politician.

Born in Chicago, Illinois, Soden graduated from Steinmetz High School. He went to the Air Forces Institute and the College of DuPage. He served in the United States Navy during World War II. He then worked for the Illinois Bell Telephone Company and retired in 1982. Soden was a member of the Veterans of Foreign Wars and was involved with veterans affairs. Soden lived in Wood Dale, Illinois. He served on the DuPage County, Illinois Board of Commissioners and was a Republican. Soden served as president of the DuPage Forest Preserve District. In 2003, Soden was appointed to the Illinois State Senate and did not seek re-election. Soden died of lung disease at a hospital in St. Joseph, Michigan.

Notes

1924 births
2012 deaths
Politicians from Chicago
People from Wood Dale, Illinois
Military personnel from Illinois
County board members in Illinois
County officials in Illinois
Republican Party Illinois state senators
United States Navy personnel of World War II